Ennapadam Srinivas Krishnamoorthy FRCP (born 3 December 1966)  is a neuropsychiatrist with special interests in  Epilepsy and Dementia. He is Founder and Director of Neurokrish - the neuropsychaitry centre and TRIMED - a chain of integrative medical specialties based in Chennai, India. He is Professor of Neuropsychiatry, Neurology and Clinical Neuroscience at The Institute of Neurological Sciences, Voluntary Health Services Multispeciality Hospital and Research Institute affiliated to The Tamil Nadu Dr. M.G.R. Medical University.

It is to be noted that his father, Dr. Krishnamoorthy Srinivas was a great Neurologist who has served the humanity thru' VHS & Public Health Centre, West Mambalam, Chennai. His father was having 3 FRCPs & was intensively trained in Canada. It was his father's inspiration which made Dr. Ennapadam Srinivas Krishnamoorthy specialise in Neurology & related subjects.

He is also Adjunct Professor at the Public Health Foundation of India and Manipal University. He is President - Elect of the International Neuropsychiatric Association 

Krishnamoorthy has chaired the International League Against Epilepsy- Commission on Psychobiology; the World Health Organization- World Health Report 2012 (Dementia), Executive Committee Member of the International Neuropsychiatry Association (since 2004) and Asian Society Against Dementia (since 2005).

He is the recipient of the President's Medal of the Royal College of Psychiatrists for contributions to community neuropsychiatry. He was the first Indian Psychiatrist to be elected Fellow of all three Royal Colleges of Physicians in the UK (Glasgow, Edinburgh & London).

Writing
Krishnamoorthy is a regular contributor to The Hindu and numerous other medical, scientific and general publications. He has contributed more than 85 high-impact research articles and book chapters focusing upon Epilepsy, Dementia and Neuropsychiatry.

He is the editor of The Global Approach series books published by Cambridge University Press. Together   with   Jeffrey L. Cummings and Martin James Prince he edited the first book in that series, Dementia: a global approach,  (2011). Together with  Simon D Shorvon, Steven C Schachter and Vivek Misra, he edited the second book, Epilepsy: a global approach (March 2017 ).

References

1966 births
Living people
Indian psychiatrists
Medical doctors from Chennai